Zionism is the movement that supports the creation of a Jewish homeland.

Zionism or Zionites may also refer to:

Unrelated to the movement that supports the creation of a Jewish homeland
African Zionism, a religious movement in southern Africa
Zionist churches, a group of Christian denominations that derive from the Christian Catholic Apostolic Church
Christ Community Church in Zion, Illinois, U.S., members of which are sometimes called Zionites
Zionites (Germany), an 18th century sect

Related to the movement that supports the creation of a Jewish homeland
Christian Zionism
Cultural Zionism
Federal Zionism
General Zionism
Green Zionism
Labor Zionism
Mormon Zionism
Nietzschean Zionism
Reform Zionism
Religious Zionism
Revisionist Zionism

See also
Anti-Zionism
Neo-Zionism
Non-Zionism
Post-Zionism
Proto-Zionism
Zion (disambiguation)
Zionist Occupation Government conspiracy theory
Zionist entity